Turris ambages is a species of sea snail, a marine gastropod mollusk in the family Turridae, the turrids.

Description
The length of the shell varies between 20 mm and 31 mm

Distribution
This marine species occurs off KwaZulu-Natal (South Africa), Mozambique and the Philippines.

References

 Kilburn R.N., Fedosov A.E. & Olivera B.M. (2012) Revision of the genus Turris Batsch, 1789 (Gastropoda: Conoidea: Turridae) with the description of six new species. Zootaxa 3244: 1-58.
 Steyn, D. G.; Lussi, M. (2005). Offshore Shells of Southern Africa: A pictorial guide to more than 750 Gastropods. Published by the authors. pp. i–vi, 1–289.

External links
 Barnard, K. H. (1958). Contributions to the knowledge of South African marine Mollusca. Part I. Gastropoda: Prosobranchiata: Toxoglossa. Annals of the South African Museum. 44(1): 73-163
 Kilburn, R.N. (1983) Turridae (Mollusca: Gastropoda) of southern Africa and Mozambique. Part 1. Subfamily Turrinae. Annals of the Natal Museum, 25, 549–585.

ambages
Gastropods described in 1958